Shallow Pools (stylized as shallow pools) is an American indie pop band based in Boston, Massachusetts. The band has four members, drummer Ali Ajemian, lead vocalist Glynnis Brennan, guitarist Jess Gromada and bassist Haley Senft.

Career

Origin
Friends since middle school, Jess Gromada and Glynnis Brennan befriended Ali Ajemian once they entered high school. They all loved playing music together and started by playing acoustic cover songs in 2012, originally under the name Patella Talk; before deciding in 2016 to begin writing their own music under the name Self Titled, before ultimately choosing to begin releasing under the name shallow pools in 2018.

Shortly after deciding on the name, they met songwriter and producer Chris Curran, who helped to shape the sound and direction of the new project. In July 2019, Haley Senft joined the band as a live bassist exclusively before becoming an official member later that year.

Spring - EP & Singles (2018–2020)

The band expressed their desire to "promote inclusivity" and to "create a safe space for listeners to express themselves through their music." With their message, they released their debut single as shallow pools, "It's A You Thing.", in July 2018, followed by "Sinking" in August of that same year.

On March 8, 2019, the band's debut EP Spring, was released. The EP was met with praise, with Alt Corner commenting on Glynnis' "emotive vocals" and the songs "deliciously melodic choruses".

The quartet went on to release four singles throughout 2020, "Haunted", "Bloom", "Afterlight" and "Turnaround".

headspace EP (2021)

The band began 2021 by releasing new music through ESI Records, marking a new era for the band, and put out a single on January 15, 2021, titled "ice water" with a music video released the same day. This release is a notable contrast from their earlier work; the band noting that the coming releases are "a departure from the music we’ve made in the past, but it’s the perfect bridge between our old and new sound."

On February 19, 2021, the second single was released, titled "glow", with another official music video.

On March 26, 2021, the third single was released, titled "nothing new", with another official music video.

On April 30, 2021, the fourth single was released, titled "it's alright", with another official music video.

On June 4, 2021, headspace EP was released along with the fifth and final single, titled "gardens", with another official music video.

Signing to Equal Vision (2022)

In November of 2022 the band signed to Equal Vision Records and released a new single, "Say What You Want".

Personal lives
All four members are active politically and socially engaged. They are all advocates for LGBTQ equality, as well as members of the community themselves.

In 2020, the band created a t-shirt inspired by their single "Turnaround", and donated all proceeds to the Marsha P. Johnson Institute, which defends and protects the rights of black transgender people.

Band members

Current members 

 Ali Ajemian – drums
 Glynnis Brennan – lead vocals
 Jess Gromada – guitar
 Haley Senft – bass

Musical style 
shallow pools' musical style has been described as indie pop and glimmer pop, and has cited as musical and career influences Lights, Fickle Friends and Dua Lipa.

Discography

Extended plays 
- Spring, (2019)

- headspace, (2021)

- daydreaming, (2022)

Singles

Music videos

Awards and nominations
Boston Music Awards

References

External links 

 

Alternative rock groups from Massachusetts
American pop rock music groups
American indie pop groups
American alternative rock groups
American synth-pop groups
Musical quartets
All-female bands
LGBT-themed musical groups
Equal Vision Records artists